This is a list of named catenae on Mars. In planetary geology, a catena is a chain of similarly sized craters. On Mars, they are named after nearby classical albedo features as prescribed by the International Astronomical Union's rules for planetary nomenclature. While catenae on most bodies of the Solar System consist of mainly of impact craters, those on Mars consist primarily of collapse pits.

References
This article was adapted from the Gazetteer of Planetary Nomenclature

See also
List of craters on Mars